Guangming Subdistrict is a subdistrict in the center of Shunyi District, Beijing, China. It borders Shuangfeng Subdistrict in its north, Renhe Town in its east, Shiyuan Subdistrict in its south, and Shengli Subdistrict in its west. As of 2020, its population was 70,609.

History 
In 1998, Guangming Subdistrict was created as a part of the newly formed Shunyi District. 3 years later, Shiyuan Subdistrict was created from the southern portions of Shengli and Guangming Subdistricts.

Administrative divisions 

At the end of 2021, Guangming Subdistrict was divided into the following 18 communities:

Gallery

See also 

 List of township-level divisions of Beijing

References 

Shunyi District
Subdistricts of Beijing